Bluewater Bay is a small seaside suburb located approximately 15 km north of Port Elizabeth in the Eastern Cape, South Africa.

Geography
Bluewater Bay is situated on Algoa Bay and is surrounded by the St George's Strand in the north, Indian Ocean to the east, Amsterdamhoek in the west and the Swartkops River in the south.

References 

Populated places in Nelson Mandela Bay
Port Elizabeth
Populated coastal places in South Africa